Red Sun of Darkover is an anthology of fantasy and science fiction short stories edited by Marion Zimmer Bradley. The stories are set in Bradley's world of Darkover. The book was first published by DAW Books (No. 725) in November 1987.

Contents
 Introduction by Marion Zimmer Bradley
 "A Different Kind of Victory" by Diana L. Paxson
 "The Ballad of Hastur and Cassilda" by Marion Zimmer Bradley
 "Flight" by Nina Boal
 "Salt" by Diann Partridge
 "The Wasteland" by Deborah Wheeler
 "A Cell Opens" by Joe Wilcox
 "The Sum of the Parts" by Dorothy J. Heydt
 "Devil's Advocate" by Patricia Anne Buard
 "Kihar" by Vera Nazarian
 "Playfellow" by Elisabeth Waters
 "Different Path" by P. J. Buchanan
 "The Shadow" by Marion Zimmer Bradley
 "Coils" by Patricia Shaw Mathews
 "The Promise" by Mary Fenoglio
 "The Dare" by Marny Whiteaker

Sources 
 
 
 
 

Darkover books
1987 anthologies
American anthologies
Fantasy anthologies
Works by Marion Zimmer Bradley
Science fiction short story collections
DAW Books books